The  mixed individual BC4 boccia event at the 2020 Summer Paralympics took place between 28 August to 4 September at the Ariake Gymnastics Centre in Tokyo. 24 competitors took part.

Final stage
The knockout stage was played between 30 August to 1 September.

Pool stages

Pool A

Pool B

Pool C

Pool D

Pool E

Pool F

References

Individual BC4